The Women's 400m Individual Medley (IM) event at the 2007 Pan American Games took place at the Maria Lenk Aquatic Park in Rio de Janeiro, Brazil, with the final being swum on July 17.

Medalists

Records

Results

References
agendapan
For the Record, Swimming World Magazine, September 2007 (p. 48+49)

Medley, Women's 400
2007 in women's swimming